Udaya Tara Nayar is a film journalist in India.

Early life
Udaya Tara Nayar was born in Trivandrum on 15 August 1947 as the fifth child of Shri S Ayyappan Pillai, Commissioner of Trivandrum Corporation, and Jebalabai. She had her initial schooling at Holy Angels Convent, Kunnukuzhi, Trivandrum.  Her father moved to Mumbai after he retired and Udaya Tara Nayar continued her schooling in Mumbai at St Anthony’s High School, Chembur. She graduated in English Literature and French from the University of Mumbai as a student of Ramnarain Ruia College in 1966.

Career

Early career 
Udaya Tara Nayar began her journalism career in 1967 at Screen, under the mentorship of editor Shri S S Pillai, her paternal uncle. Pillai fostered an ethic of writing "from her conscience, adhering to facts and truths , treating all as equal, not hurting anyone, taking a detached, objective approach." This helped Mrs Nayar earn a reputation for being unbiased and balanced in her writing.

In 1995, Mrs Nayar launched the Screen Awards, the first awards of the Hindi cinema industry to be judged by a jury representing all sectors and crafts of the industry. Under her leadership, the Screen Awards became noted for their fairness and freedom from manipulation and bias.

In 1996, Mrs Nayar left Screen to pursue personal commitments. In her absence, the publication changed from a broadsheet format to a magazine format. Mrs Nayar returned in 1998 as editor, and restored the broadsheet format.

In 2000, Mrs Nayar once again left Screen to help raise her grandchildren. It was at this time that Dilip Kumar approached her to write his biography, The Substance and the Shadow, which made the Amazon bestseller list within two weeks of its publication.

Awards and honours
Mrs Nayar has won the following honours, recognitions and awards for her contribution to cinema journalism:
 Head of the National Jury for Books in the National Film Awards three times 1996, 1998 and 2004.
 Member of the Script Advisory Committee of Children's Film Society, India in 1998-1999.
 Member of the Advisory Council of Film and Television Institute of India in 1998-1999.
 Head of the Jury for the Aravindan Awards in Kerala.
 Honoured by the Chief Minister of Kerala, Shri A.K. Antony as a Global Malayalee in 2000, an award bestowed on distinguished Malayalees for their contribution to social betterment.
 The Best Junior Citizen award by the South Bombay Jaycees Committee in 1989 for creating a healthy trend in clean journalism.
 The Salaam Bombay Magazine award for the Best Cinema Journalist in 1989.
 The K.A. Abbas Memorial Award for Excellence in Film Journalism in 1989.
 The Priyanka Gandhi Award for Excellence in Film Journalism and championing of clean film journalism in 2004, given by the World of Priyanka Gandhi magazine.
 The 50th National Film Awards, presented by Directorate of Film Festivals, were announced by a committee headed by Prakash Jha, Rajiv Mehrotra and Udaya Tara Nayar for the feature films, non-feature films and books written on Indian cinema.

Personal 
Mrs Nayar is married to V V Nayar, a pharmaceutical executive. They have one daughter, Vasanthamalini, and two grandchildren. , Mrs Nayar is writing a book of short stories set in the southern India of her youth, dedicated to her grandchildren.

References

External links
 Uday Tara Nayar interview. Glamsham.com

Indian film critics
Journalists from Kerala
1947 births
Living people
Indian women critics
Writers from Thiruvananthapuram
Women writers from Kerala
20th-century Indian journalists
20th-century Indian women writers
Indian women journalists